The Chestatee River (variant spellings Chestatie, Chestetee, Chostatee, Chosteta, Chestotee; none in modern use) is a  river in the Appalachian Mountains of northern Georgia, USA.

The word "Chestatee" is a Cherokee word meaning roughly "pine torch place" or "place of lights", because they would use bonfires along the riverbanks to light their torches.  They would then use these torches for hunting deer and other wild game in the forest.  The Chestatee Regional Library System takes its name from the river, as do Chestatee High School and Middle School in Gainesville.  In a nod to the origins of the name, CHS strives to be "a place of light" to their students.

Course

It begins at the confluence of Dicks Creek and Frogtown Creek (near the junction of U.S. 19 and U.S. 129) in northeastern Lumpkin County, flowing down by the county seat and former Georgia Gold Rush town of Dahlonega, and then under the northern terminus of the Georgia 400 expressway from Atlanta.  It originally continued past the southern corner of the county, forming the entire eastern border of southern Dawson County with northwestern Hall County, and the far northern part of Forsyth's border with Hall. The river was used as a defining line in the Cherokee Treaty of Washington 1819 and the eastern border of the Hickory Log District of the Cherokee Nation before removal

It is a major tributary of the Chattahoochee River, into which it ended at a point now under the waters of Lake Lanier, since Buford Dam was finished in 1956. The northwestern arm of the lake, which flooded the lower  of the river, is called Chestatee Bay, which destroyed the town of Chestatee (called Atsunsta Ti Yi by the native Cherokee people) when it was submerged. The county boundaries still follow the original thalwegs of the river, with the lake coming as far up the river as Lumpkin's southernmost tip.

Watershed and sub-watershed details
The Chestatee River basin area consists of three HUC-10 watersheds, namely 0313000105, 0313000106, and 0313000107, and 14 sub-watersheds, listed below.

HUC-10 0313000105

HUC-10 0313000106

HUC-10 0313000107

Hydrology
There is one stream gauge (NWS location identifier DGAG) along the river, installed in 1907 at State Route 52 near Dahlonega. This is about ten times its average height or depth.

See also
 Water Resource Region
 South Atlantic-Gulf Water Resource Region
 Apalachicola basin

References

External links
USGS real-time gauge at Dahlonega

2Chestatee
Chattahoochee River
Rivers of Dawson County, Georgia
Rivers of Forsyth County, Georgia
Rivers of Hall County, Georgia
Rivers of Lumpkin County, Georgia
Rivers of Georgia (U.S. state)
Georgia placenames of Native American origin